Unnatural History is a television series produced by Warner Horizon Television for Cartoon Network and YTV.

The series is the second scripted, live-action show on Cartoon Network after the failure of Out of Jimmy's Head. The series consisted of thirteen hour-long episodes and premiered on Sunday, June 13, 2010. On July 13, the series was rescheduled to Tuesday nights.

It is only the second Cartoon Network show outside of Adult Swim and Toonami to have the U.S. rating of "TV-PG-V", and a parental-guidance warning after every commercial break and at the beginning of the show (the first being Star Wars: The Clone Wars); its rating in Canada for most episodes is "G", or else "PG".

On November 19, 2010, Cartoon Network cancelled the series after one season.

Premise
This series is centered on Henry Griffin, a teenager with exceptional skills acquired through years of globe-trotting with his anthropologist parents. But Henry faces his biggest challenge of all when he moves back to America to attend Smithson High School in Washington D.C., a place stranger than any he's ever lived before. Together with his cousin Jasper and Jasper's friend Maggie, he uses the skills that he learned around the globe to solve the postmodern mysteries of high school.

Cast and characters

Main characters
 Henry Griffin (Kevin G. Schmidt) is a globe-trotting teenager who must adjust to life as regular high school student. With his knowledge of different cultures, he uses his skills to solve different crimes and mysteries of ancient history. He has lived all over the world with his anthropologist parents. He was forced at the beginning of the pilot episode to move in with cousin Jasper and uncle Bryan and go to high school in Washington, D.C. His family's constant re-locations include Bhutan, Liberia, Mexico, Turkmenistan, Japan, Peru, Egypt and Brazil. Through these countries he has learned many different skills ranging from reading dead languages, martial arts, even escape artistisms. He is also quite skilled at parkour now living in the urban jungle. He exhibits somewhat impaired social interaction, and is often not attentive to the conversations of Jasper and Maggie. He had a beloved, late godfather named Dante Mourneau, whose words of wisdom he still uses in times of uncertainty.
 Jasper Bartlett (Jordan Gavaris) is Henry's cousin in Washington, D.C. Unlike Henry, he does not like getting into trouble and prefers staying out of Henry's shenanigans but always gets involved anyway. He is very much into his schoolwork and dreams of attending Yale University. He was also shown in the series to possess a good memory. He and Maggie have known each other since they were ten and it's implied that Jasper has a crush on her, as he always seems to get jealous whenever she and Henry seem to express a romantic interest in each other.

 Margaret "Maggie" Winnock (Italia Ricci) is best friends with Henry and Jasper. Like Jasper, she is a very dedicated student. She does not have much of a sense of humor and when she is not in school she works part-time at the school's National Museum Complex. She is a vegetarian, and has photographic memory, which is often used to help solve mysteries. It's implied that she has a crush on Henry as he always protects her and she tells him everything first.
 Bryan Bartlett (Martin Donovan) is Henry's uncle (his mom's brother) and Jasper's dad. He is the dean of Smithson High School. He is always caught off guard by Henry's knowledge and troublesome ways, but welcomes them if they are done in good faith to better certain situations.

Recurring characters
 Hunter O'Herlihy (Wesley Morgan) is a stereotypical jock who plays for the football team of the school. He has very little intelligence and often displays abusive behavior to anyone around him, especially Jasper and Henry, often serving as an antagonist towards the group. However, he has shown some morals, as if someone helps him he will later repay the favor, stating he doesn't like to owe anybody.
 Julian Morneau (Matt Baram) is an Ornithology teacher as well as the estranged son of Dante. He is displayed as Henry's enemy in many episodes, which seems to stem from the fact that his father saw Henry as more of a son. He also appears to have his hands in shady places, such as helping in the illegal transport of an endangered species, as well as Henry is quick to suspect he might have a hand in some of the activities pertaining to the events of the episode.
 Rosmary Griffin (née Bartlett) (Jack Hourigan) is Henry's mother and the younger sister of Bryan who is actually skeptical of her son's recent activities and during the season finale, she and her husband at first views her son as a disgrace to the Griffin name after a humiliating incident, but after Henry saves the day once again, she and her husband realized what a great person her son really is around the campus.
 Zafer Griffin (Scott Yaphe) is Henry's father who was also skeptical of his son's recent activities, but later realized how good a person Henry really is.
 Michael O'Molley (Robbie Amell) is another antagonist of Henry and his friends. He also has a rude attitude in general. He works at the juice bar located at the National Museum Complex.

Episodes

Reception

Critical reception
Unnatural History received mixed to positive reviews from critics, with Barry Garron of The Hollywood Reporter praising it as "an appealing mix between The Hardy Boys and Indiana Jones with National Treasure thrown in for good measure". Los Angeles Times writer Robert Lloyd found the show fun and lively, composed of "familiar, mashed-together" action-adventure themes. Variety reviewer Brian Lowry was more critical, calling it "unexciting" and lacking "the requisite thrills a young audience weaned on big-budget movies is apt to demand."

Viewer reception
According to the Nielsen ratings, the premiere episode was watched by 1.39 million viewers, though the pilot episode did not place in the Top 25 cable programs for the week of June 7–13, 2010. Of that audience, the pilot episode earned 334,000 viewers among boys aged 6–11 earning a 2.7 in that demographic, with Cartoon Network claiming gains among kids 2-11, kids 9-14, and other kids demographics compared to the same time period the previous year.

Cancellation and intended second season plans
On November 19, 2010, it was announced that Cartoon Network would not renew the series for a second season. On December 29, 2010, creator Mike Werb revealed that he intended to have the show picked up by another network, but a deal could not be secured. Werb also revealed his plans if the show had been renewed for a second season:

References

External links
 
 Unnatural History DVD Release info

2010 American television series debuts
2010 American television series endings
2010s American high school television series
2010s American mystery television series
2010s American teen drama television series
American adventure television series
Cartoon Network original programming
English-language television shows
Martial arts television series
Television series about teenagers
Television series by Warner Horizon Television
Television shows filmed in Toronto
Television shows set in Washington, D.C.